Compass Cay is an island in The Bahamas, located in the Exuma district. The island, notable for its naturally-protected harbor, has been outfitted with a beach lodge and a marina. The island also has a famed population of docile nurse sharks. The nurse sharks in the marina have become a popular tourist attraction, bringing in visitors from as far as the island of Nassau. The marina has a small shop with trinkets and snacks. It is also developing a restaurant. There is a large maze of mangroves that lead out from the marina. Walking throughout the island, you can find a beach and a "landing strip," a long patch of sand only visible at low tide. There are also several cottages one can rent.

References

Islands of the Bahamas